Annette Kay Hurley (born 23 March 1955) is a former Australian politician. Elected at the 2004 federal election, she was a Labor member of the Australian Senate from July 2005, representing the state of South Australia. She announced in July 2010 that she would not re-contest her seat at the following federal election and her six-year term ended on 30 June 2011.

Hurley was educated at the University of Adelaide, where she graduated in science. Before entering federal politics, she was member of the South Australian House of Assembly for the safe Labor seat of Napier in Adelaide's northern suburbs from 1993 to 2002, and was Deputy Leader of the Opposition 1997–2002. At the 2002 South Australian state election, she decided to stand in Light, a previously safe Liberal seat that had been made marginal in a redistribution. Hurley lost narrowly to Liberal incumbent Malcolm Buckby. At that election, Labor fell one seat short of a majority. Had Hurley won Light, she would have delivered her party majority government and become South Australia's first female Deputy Premier.

In June 2005, before even taking her seat in the Senate, Hurley was elected to the Opposition front bench and appointed Shadow Minister for Citizenship and Multicultural Affairs. She lost her front bench position in December 2006, after a shadow cabinet reshuffle instigated by new Leader of the Opposition Kevin Rudd due to criticism of her fast promotion to the frontbench despite the fact that she had been deputy leader of the SA branch of the ALP.

Her promotion to the federal frontbench was a reward for taking the political risks which saw the end of her career in the South Australian Parliament and stopped her from becoming the state's Deputy Premier rather than the misperception that it was solely because of a factional arrangement.

References

Annette Hurley, First Speech to Parliament
Annette Hurley, Senate Biography
Hurley dumped as Rudd picks team, The Age, 7 December 2006.

|-

1955 births
Living people
University of Adelaide alumni
Australian Labor Party members of the Parliament of Australia
Members of the Australian Senate
Members of the Australian Senate for South Australia
Women members of the Australian Senate
Members of the South Australian House of Assembly
Australian Labor Party members of the Parliament of South Australia
21st-century Australian politicians
21st-century Australian women politicians
Women members of the South Australian House of Assembly